Charles T. Royer (born August 22, 1939) is an American news reporter and politician who served as the 48th mayor of Seattle, Washington from 1978 to 1990. After serving as mayor of Seattle, Royer became the director of the Harvard Institute of Politics.

Career as a reporter
A Medford, Oregon native, Royer worked as a reporter for KVAL-TV and KEZI-TV in Eugene, Oregon while attending the University of Oregon. He spent the seven years following his 1966 graduation from the School of Journalism as a reporter and news analyst. He reported first at KOIN and then at KING-TV in Seattle, where he shared a beat with his brother, Bob. In 1969, he received an award from the American Political Science Association for distinguished public affairs reporting. In 1975 he received the Sigma Delta Chi Distinguished Service award and the Edward R. Murrow award for editorializing on television. He was awarded a fellowship to study government and public policy at the Washington, D.C. Journalism Center. He was also a visiting associate at the Harvard-MIT Joint Center for Urban Studies from 1969 to 1970.

Mayor of Seattle

In 1977, Royer defeated 13 other candidates to become the mayor of Seattle. He served three four-year terms in that office, longer than any other mayor in the city's history. He oversaw a number of improvements in the city, including a recycling program that is recognized as the best in the nation. His administration tackled social issues such as poverty, teenage pregnancy and drugs. As President of the National League of Cities in 1983, he became a spokesperson for American cities on housing, healthcare, civil liberties, and the needs of children.

In 1989, Business Month named Seattle as one of the best-managed cities in the nation. Places Rated Almanac called it the nation's "Most Livable City," and the National Urban Coalition named Royer the Distinguished Urban Mayor of the Year.

Directorship at Harvard
In 1990, Royer succeeded Richard Thornburgh as director of the Harvard Institute of Politics at the John F. Kennedy School of Government. Democratic National Committee member Ronald H. Brown of the IOP's senior advisory committee stated, "Mayor Royer believes that people make the real difference in politics, and in bringing the people of his city together he has been one of the most innovative and artful city executives in the nation." Royer's appointment created recognition that, as The Seattle Times commented, "not all political savvy emanates from the East Coast."

From 1995 to 2006, Royer served as director of the National Program Office for the Urban Health Initiative, which is funded by the Robert Wood Johnson Foundation. UHI worked closely with five United States cities (Baltimore, Detroit, Oakland, Philadelphia, and Richmond, Virginia) to help improve the health and safety of children living in those areas.

Recent activities
In 2005, he established the non-profit Institute for Community Change to continue guiding work at the national level toward improving the health of communities. In 2007, Royer became founding partner in the consulting firm The Royer Group which provides professional consulting services in public policy development, governmental liaison, public finance, business and leadership development, marketing communications and program management. He was considered as a possible appointment as King County Executive, a position vacated in May 2009 when Ron Sims was appointed as Deputy Director of United States Department of Housing and Urban Development by the Obama administration.

Royer's son Jordan  ran unsuccessfully for Seattle City Council in 2009.

See also
 Timeline of Seattle, 1970s-1980s

References

External links

Politicians from Medford, Oregon
University of Oregon alumni
Harvard University faculty
Mayors of Seattle
1939 births
Living people
Washington (state) Independents